Vernon James Ehlers (February 6, 1934 – August 15, 2017) was an American physicist and politician who represented Michigan in the U.S. House of Representatives from 1993 until his retirement in 2011. A Republican, he also served eight years in the Michigan Senate and two in the Michigan House of Representatives.

Ehlers was the first research physicist to be elected to Congress; he was later joined by Rush Holt, Jr. (D-NJ) and Bill Foster (D-IL).

Early life, education, and academic career
Born in Pipestone, Minnesota, Ehlers attended Calvin College in Grand Rapids for three years before transferring to the University of California, Berkeley, where he earned an undergraduate degree in physics and, in 1960, a Ph.D. in nuclear physics.  His doctoral dissertation, "The nuclear spins and moments of several radioactive gallium isotopes", is available from University Microfilms International as document number 0227304. After six years of teaching and research at Berkeley, he moved back to Michigan and took employment at Calvin College in 1966, where he taught physics for 16 years and later served as chairman of the Physics Department.

Ehlers died on August 15, 2017, at the age of 83.

Early political career
Ehlers served on the Kent County Board of Commissioners from 1975 to 1982. Ehlers served from 1983 to 1985 in the Michigan House of Representatives and then served from 1985 to 1993 in the Michigan Senate.

U.S. House of Representatives

Committee assignments
 Committee on Education and Labor
 Subcommittee on Early Childhood, Elementary and Secondary Education
 Subcommittee on Higher Education, Lifelong Learning, and Competitiveness
 Committee on House Administration (Chairman and Ranking Member) 
 Committee on Science and Technology
 Subcommittee on Energy and Environment
 Subcommittee on Research and Science Education (Ranking Member)
 Committee on Transportation and Infrastructure
 Subcommittee on Aviation
 Subcommittee on Coast Guard and Maritime Transportation
 Subcommittee on Water Resources and Environment

Caucus memberships
 Co-chair of the STEM (science, technology, engineering and mathematics) Ed Caucus
 Peak Oil Caucus

Ehlers served as chairman of the House Administration Committee in the 109th Congress after Bob Ney resigned from the position.

A portrait of Ehlers during his service as chairman of the Administration Committee is in the House collection.

Political positions
Ehlers was a moderate Republican. According to the National Journal, in 2006 his votes split 50-50 between "liberal" and "conservative."  While strongly anti-abortion and supportive of lowering taxes, he was willing to break with his party on environmental and government spending issues. He was a member of the Republican Main Street Partnership and Republicans for Environmental Protection. He was the only member of the Michigan Congressional delegation of either party to vote to raise fuel economy standards for automobiles in 2001 and 2005.

Ehlers was a staunch advocate of a federal prohibition of online poker. In 2006 he cosponsored H.R. 4411, the Goodlatte-Leach Internet Gambling Prohibition Act and H.R. 4777, the Internet Gambling Prohibition Act.

Owing to his votes in favor of the Federal Marriage Amendment in both 2004 and 2006, as well as his votes against hate crimes legislation and prohibiting job discrimination based on sexual orientation, Ehlers was given a 0% rating by the Human Rights Campaign, indicating a voting record generally opposed to gay rights. However, in December 2010, Ehlers was one of fifteen Republican House members to vote in favor of repealing the United States military's "Don't Ask, Don't Tell" ban on openly gay service members, and one of eight Republicans to vote for the DREAM Act.

Political campaigns

In 1993 Ehlers won a special election for the 3rd District, which had been vacant since Congressman Paul B. Henry died six months into his fifth term. He won a full term in 1994 and was re-elected six times with little significant Democratic opposition. Ehlers retired from Congress in 2010.

Selected publications

Lead authored articles in scientific journals

Articles on science policy

References

External links
 Vern Ehlers for U.S. Congress official campaign site
 
 

|-

|-

|-

1934 births
2017 deaths
American Calvinist and Reformed Christians
Calvin University alumni
Calvin University faculty
County commissioners in Michigan
Republican Party members of the Michigan House of Representatives
Republican Party Michigan state senators
Politicians from Grand Rapids, Michigan
University of California, Berkeley alumni
American members of the Christian Reformed Church in North America
People from Pipestone, Minnesota
Republican Party members of the United States House of Representatives from Michigan
20th-century American politicians
21st-century American politicians